The 2020–21 season was the Indian Arrows' 7th competitive season in one of the top-flight league of Indian football, I-league. Indian Arrows was formed in 2010 on the behest on then Indian team coach, Bob Houghton, with the main goal of nurturing young talent in India in the hope of qualifying for 2018 FIFA World Cup in Russia. It was disbanded by AIFF in 2013 when their club sponsor, Pailan Group, could not financially support the group. But revived again in 2017–18 season immediately after FIFA U-17 World Cup.

Technical staff

Squad
{|class="wikitable" style="text-align:center; font-size:90%; width:80%;"
|-
!style="background:#034694; color:white; text-align:center;"|No.
!style="background:#034694; color:white; text-align:center;"|Name
!style="background:#034694; color:white; text-align:center;"|Nationality
!style="background:#034694; color:white; text-align:center;"|Date of Birth (Age)
|-
!colspan=5 text-align:center;"|Goalkeepers
|-
|
|Naveen Saini
| Punjab
|
|-
|
|Santosh Singh Irengbam
| Manipur
|
|-
|
|Syed Zahid Hussain Bukhari
| Jammu and Kashmir
|
|-
|
|Ahan Prakash
|  Karnataka
|
|-
!colspan=5 text-align:center;"|Defenders
|-
|
|Abdul Hanan
| Jammu and Kashmir
|
|-
|
|Kushang Subba 
|Sikkim
|
|-
|
|Sajad Hussain Parray
| Jammu and Kashmir
|
|-
|
|Praful Kumar 
| Karnataka
|
|-
|
|Evan Thapa
| Sikkim
|
|-
|
|Tankadhar Bag
| Odisha
|
|-
|
|Dipu Halder
| West Bengal
|
|-
|
|Brijesh Giri
| West Bengal
|
|-
|
|Leewan Castanha
| Goa
|
|-
|
|Gurkirat Singh
| Chandigarh
|
|-
!colspan=5 text-align:center;"|Midfielders
|-
|
|Pragyan Medhi
| Assam
|
|-
|
|Lalchhanhima Chawnghlut
| Mizoram
|
|-
|
|Harsh Shailesh Patre
| Goa
|
|-
|
|Lalchhanhima Sailo
| Mizoram
|
|-
|
|Ricky John Shabong
| Meghalaya
|
|-

!colspan=5 text-align:center;"|Forwards
|-
|
|Vanlalruatfela Thlacheu
| Mizoram
|
|-
|
|Parthib Sunder Gogoi
| Assam
|
|-
|
|Arya Gandharva
| Maharashtra
|
|-
|
|Mohamed L. Ahamed
|
|
|-
|
|Tapan Haldar
| West Bengal
|
|-
|
|Vishva Vijay Shinde
| Maharashtra
|
|-

Competitions

Overview

I-League

League table (Phase-1)

Relegation stage (Group B)

Results by matchday

IFA Shield

Group C

Results & Schedule

IFA Shield

I-League

Phase-2

Statistics

Goal Scorers

References

Indian Arrows FC seasons
2020–21 I-League by team